Cleveland Tower is a bell tower containing a carillon on the campus of Princeton University. Inspired by Boston College's Gasson Hall, the design by Ralph Adams Cram is one of the defining Collegiate Gothic architectural features of the university's Graduate College. The tower was built in 1913 as a memorial to former university trustee and  U.S. President Grover Cleveland. A bust of the former president is the centerpiece of the grand chamber at the tower's ground level.

Class of 1892 Bells
The tower's carillon is a gift of the class of 1892, which presented the bells as their 35th reunion dedication to the university in 1927. The English foundry Gillett & Johnston cast the original 35 bells. A plaque near the tower's entrance reads:

The Class of Eighteen Ninety Two presents the carillon in this tower to Princeton University with love and gratitude and the hope that its bells may ever inspire coming generations of Princeton men to maintain the traditions of their alma mater in the service of God and of their country

Originally dedicated on June 17, 1927, the bells were rededicated after decades of varying use and maintenance on June 13, 1993. The Class of 1892 Bells are now one of the largest carillons in the world with 67 bells and a bourdon (G) weighing . The Chapel Music Program maintains the carillon program with assistance from an endowment by the class of 1892. The bells play Sunday afternoons by university carillonneur Lisa Lonie, and weekday evenings by students, except during exam periods. The summer programs include performances by international guests. A carillon practice room is also housed in the Graduate College basement.

Lisa J. Lonie, University Carillonneur, is the only fourth carillonneur in the instrument's +80 year history and the first female to hold the position.

See also
 American Collegiate Gothic towers:
 Gasson Hall, Boston College
 Harkness Tower, Yale University
 Duke Chapel, Duke University
 Trinity College Chapel, Hartford
 List of carillons in the United States

References

Carillons
Towers completed in 1913
Princeton University buildings
1913 establishments in New Jersey